A floating signifier (also sometimes referred to as an empty signifier, but Ernesto Laclau separates both concepts) is a signifier without a referent in semiotics and discourse analysis, such as a word that points to no actual object and has no agreed upon meaning.  The term open signifier is sometimes used as a synonym due to the empty signifier's nature to "resist the constitution of any unitary meaning" thus enabling its ability to remain open to different meanings in different contexts.

Definition
Claude Lévi-Strauss originated this term, where he identifies terms like mana (magical mystical substance of which the magic is formed) "to represent an undetermined quantity of signification, in itself void of meaning and thus apt to receive any meaning".  Daniel Chandler defines the term as "a signifier with a vague, highly variable, unspecifiable or non-existent signified". As such a "floating signifier" may "mean different things to different people: they may stand for many or even any signifieds; they may mean whatever their interpreters want them to mean". Such a floating signifier—which is said to possess "symbolic value zero"—necessarily results to "allow symbolic thought to operate despite the contradiction inherent in it". In Emancipation(s), Ernesto Laclau frames the empty signifier in the context of social interactions. For Laclau, the empty signifier is the hegemonic representative of a collection of various demands, constituting a chain of equivalence whose members are distinguished through a differential logic (as in elements exist only in their differences to one another) but combine through an equivalential one. This chain of unsatisfied demands create an unfulfilled totality, inside of which one signifier subordinates the rest and assumes representation of the rest via a hegemonic process.  The signifiers "empty" vs. "floating" are distinct conceptually yet in practice meld as explained by Laclau: "As we can see, the categories of ‘empty’ and ‘floating’ signifiers are structurally different. The first concerns the construction of a popular identity once the presence of a stable frontier is taken for granted; the second tries conceptually to apprehend the logic of the displacements of that frontier."  In an interview in December 2013, Laclau clarified the distinction with an example:

Because the signifier moves between projects, it is said not to be empty but floating.

Uses and examples
The Oxford Dictionary of Critical Theory gives the usage example that "Fredric Jameson suggests that the shark in the Jaws series of films is an empty signifier because it is susceptible to multiple and even contradictory interpretations, suggesting that it does not have a specific meaning itself, but functions primarily as a vehicle for absorbing meanings that viewers want to impose upon it."  

The notion of floating signifiers can be applied to concepts such as race and gender, as a way of asserting that the word is more concrete than the concept it describes, where the concept may not be stable, but the word is. It is often applied to non-linguistic signs, such as the example of the Rorschach inkblot test. Roland Barthes, while not using the term "floating signifier" explicitly, referred specifically to non-linguistic signs as being so open to interpretation that they constituted a "floating chain of signifieds." For example, the American flag is at once a signifier of the geographical nation it represents, of patriotism to that nation, of the nation's set of governmental policies or of the ideologies associated with it such as liberty. Depending on the context, the flag can carry either positive or negative significance.

The concept is used in some more textual forms of postmodernism, which rejects the strict anchoring of particular signifiers to particular signifieds and argues against the concept that there are any ultimate determinable meanings to words or signs. For example, Jacques Derrida speaks of the "freeplay" of signifiers: arguing that they are not fixed to their signifieds but point beyond themselves to other signifiers in an "indefinite referral of signifier to signified."

See also
Glittering generality

References

Bibliography

External links
Semiotics for Beginners: Modality and Representation
SBF Glossary

Semiotics